Bashan can refer to:

 Bashan - northern trans-Jordan region in Hebrew Bible accounts
 Bashan Dam
 Bashan, Iran, a village in Iran
 Başhan, Bismil, Turkey
 Başhan, Bitlis, Turkey

See also
 places in Singapore, see Bishan (disambiguation)